Admiral Henri du Couëdic de Kerérant (1868–1947) was a 20th-century French naval officer, serving during the First and Second World Wars. He restored authority on the ship that had been taken over by the mutineers. From June 1924 he was the commander in chief of the Division Navale du Levant (covering the eastern Mediterranean, the Sea of Marmara and the Dardanelles, the Black Sea, the Red Sea, and the Gulf of Aden).

Henri du Couëdic de Kerérant is issued from a very ancient noble family from Brittany dating back from the crusades (7th Crusade) and with a strong naval tradition. One of his ancestors was Ollivier du Couëdic de Kerdrain, Secrétaire Général des galéres, during the Regency (from 1713 until 1738) in France. His grandson Michel du Couëdic de Kerérant followed in his tracks as a capitaine de Vaisseau in the French Navy.

Biography

Marriage and children
1895, married to Marie du Bouaÿs de la Bégassière.

Hervé (1899–1955) 
Guilhemette (1897)

Career 

 Sub Lieutenant from August 1, 1886
 Lieutenant from October 5, 1887
 Lieutenant Commander from 5 October 1889
 Commander from 26 February 1895
 Captain from 12 August 1911
 Commodore from 26 June 1916
 Rear Admiral from January 27, 1923

At Sea
 Bouvet, Saint Louis, Patrie - December 1, 1911 - November 11, 1913 - Deputy Commander (Artillery Service)
 Kléber - July 29, 1914 - June 25, 1915 - Commander
 Henri IV - August 9, 1915 - November 15, 1915 - second in command
 Jules Michelet - July 10, 1917 - March 25, 1918 - Captain of the Commander
 Jean-Bart - April 9, 1918 - April 15, 1920 - Captain of Commandant
 Commander, Cherbourg Military harbour  - October 1, 1920 - July 1, 1922 
 South of France Maritime boundaries - 4 April 1923 - 25 June 1924 - Chief of Staff
 Naval Division of the Levant - June 25, 1924 - July 2, 1926 - Fleet Commander

Distinctions (in French) 

 Commandeur de la Légion d’honneur,
 Croix de guerre 14–18
 Distinguished Service Order (DSO)
 Commandeur de l’Ordre de sainte Anne de Russie
 Nicham Iftikar
 Médaille du Maroc

Legion of Honour

  chevalier du 24 December 1897
  officier 17 January 1917
  commandeur 30 April 1921

Bibliography

  Archives de la Marine, fort de Vincennes, SHA
  Fernand Boucard Les Dessous de l’expédition de Russie, Paris 1929
  Fernand Merle L’Amiral Guépratte, Editions de la Cité, Paris A. 
  J.P. Alem et P. Bourrat le Liban, Que sais-je ? mai 2000
  J. Nanlet Histoire du Liban, Tequi, Paris, 1986
  Marie Dupont Les Druzes Editions Brepols, Belgique 1994
  Christine Manigand Henry de Jouvenel, Haut-Commissaire de la République française en Syrie et au Liban (1925–1926). Le cours des guerres mondiales et conflits contemporains, nº 192 /1998
  Alain Peyrefitte (sous la direction de)  L’aventure du XXème siècle 1900 – 1945. Editions du Chêne, 2000. 
  Etienne Taillemite Dictionnaire illustré de la Marine.  Edition Seghers, 1962 
  Thomazi La guerre navale aux Dardanelles. Payot, Paris 1927

References

External links 

 "Ecole Navale Officiers"
 "Mutineries de la mer noire"
 express du midi, 1919 

1868 births
Commandeurs of the Légion d'honneur
People from Fontenay-le-Comte
Recipients of the Croix de Guerre (France)
1947 deaths
French Navy admirals
Recipients of the Legion of Honour
French nobility
Recipients of the Order of St. Anna